Route 772, or Highway 772, can refer to:

Canada
Alberta Highway 772
New Brunswick Route 772
Saskatchewan Highway 772

United States
 
 
 
 
 
  Virginia Route 772 (Loudoun County)
  Ashburn Station, formerly named "Route 772 Station"